The 2021–22 Cincinnati Bearcats men's basketball team represented the University of Cincinnati in the 2021–22 NCAA Division I men's basketball season. The Bearcats were led by first-year head coach Wes Miller. The team played their home games at Fifth Third Arena as members of the American Athletic Conference. They finished the season 18–15, 7–11 in AAC play to finish in seventh place.

Previous season
In a season limited due to the ongoing COVID-19 pandemic, the Bearcats finished the 2019–20 season 12–11, 8–6 in AAC play to finish in fifth place. They defeated SMU and Wichita State in the AAC tournament before losing to Houston in the championship game.. The season was the first time since 2010 that the Bearcats did not make the NCAA tournament.

On April 3, 2021, the school placed head coach John Brannen on paid leave pending an investigation after six Bearcats players decided to transfer following the season. A week later, the school fired Brannen following an investigation into his conduct. On April 14, the school named UNC Greensboro head coach Wes Miller the team's new head coach.

Offseason
Two days after the conference tournament championship, the Bearcats saw six players enter the transfer portal. On March 26, Athletic Director John Cunningham announced the university would begin investigating allegations against the program. On April 3, it was announced that head coach John Brannen was placed on indefinite leave. On April 9, the school announced Brannen had been relieved of his duties effective immediately along with assistants Jayson Gee and Sean Dwyer. Tim Morris was announced as the interim head coach. In the next few days, both Mike Saunders Jr. and Mason Madsen withdrew from the transfer portal after Miller's hiring.

Departures

Incoming transfers

Recruiting classes

2021 recruiting class 
There was no 2021 recruiting class.

2022 recruiting class

Preseason

AAC preseason media poll
On October 13, The American released the preseason Poll and other preseason awards

Preseason Awards
 AAC Preseason All-Conference Second Team - Jeremiah Davenport

Roster

Schedule and results
The Bearcats game vs Texas Southern scheduled for December 18, 2021 was canceled due to COVID-19 issues within the Tigers program. The Bearcats replaced the Texas Southern game with a game against Division II Ashland.
|-
!colspan=12 style=| Non-conference regular season

|-
!colspan=12 style=| AAC Regular Season

|-
!colspan=12 style=| AAC Tournament

Source

Awards and honors

American Athletic Conference honors

All-AAC Third Team
David DeJulius

References

Cincinnati
Cincinnati Bearcats men's basketball seasons
Cincinnati Bearcats men's basketball
Cincinnati Bearcats men's basketball